A cock and bull story is a fanciful, unlikely story.

The Cock Inn and the Bull Inn, both in Stony Stratford, a town on Watling Street (now a constituent town of Milton Keynes in Buckinghamshire), were staging posts for rival coach lines on the LondonBirmingham turnpike.  It is said that local people, regarding the passengers staying at the inns as a source of news, were told fanciful stories; there was even rivalry between the two inns as to who could tell the most outlandish story. These inns are still in existence: the Cock Hotel is documented to have existed [in one form or another] on the current site since at least 1470; the present building dates from 1742. The provenance of The Bull is less well documented but is certainly older than 1600; the present building is "late eighteenth century". 

According to another source, the rival inns were in Fenny Stratford, a nearby town on Watling Street, but no such hostelries exist there today.

Provenance
There is no known record of the provenance of the expression itself, in particular there is no reliable support for the Stony Stratford origin. The first recorded use of the phrase in English was in John Day's 1608 play Law-trickes or Who Would Have Thought It:

See also
 History of Milton Keynes#Turnpike roads

Notes

References

English-language idioms
Storytelling